Sarra Manning is an English writer and journalist. She attended the University of Sussex and took an English with media studies degree. She became a freelance writer after submitting her work to Melody Maker. She worked as the entertainment editor for five years of the now-defunct teen magazine Just Seventeen. Manning was the editor of Elle Girl (UK edition), then re-launched What To Wear magazine for the BBC and has worked on UK magazines such as Bliss and The Face. She has contributed to Elle, Seventeen, The Guardian and Details and is a contributing editor to Elle UK. She writes regularly for Grazia, Red and Stella, as well as consulting for a number of British magazine publishers. She has been dubbed the "teen queen extraordinaire" following the publication of her hit teen fiction book Guitar Girl, and the popular Diary of a Crush trilogy.

Manning is currently the literary editor of Red magazine, a UK women's magazine.

Novels
She has written over 25 novels, both young adult and adult. Her first young adult novel, Guitar Girl, was published in 2003. Her first adult novel, Unsticky, was published by Headline in 2009.

Personal life
She currently lives in North London. She had a Staffordshire Bull Terrier, Miss Betsy, and is an advocate for dog adoption.

Publications
 Guitar Girl - UK, 2003; US, 2004
 Diary of a Crush 1: French Kiss - UK, 2004; US, 2006
 Diary of a Crush 2: Kiss and Make Up - UK, 2004 (parts given away with Just Seventeen under the title, Losing It); US, 2006
 Diary of a Crush 3: Sealed with a Kiss - UK, 2004 (parts given away with Just Seventeen under the title, American Dream); US. 2006
 Pretty Things - UK & US, 2005
 Let's Get Lost - UK & US, 2006
 Fashionistas 1: Laura - UK, 2007
 Fashionistas 2: Hadley - UK, 2007
 Fashionistas 3: Irina - UK, 2008
 Fashionistas 4: Candy - UK, 2008
 Unsticky - UK, 2009
 Nobody's Girl - UK, 2010
 You Don't Have to Say You Love Me - UK, 2011
 Nine Uses For An Ex-Boyfriend - UK, 2012
 Adorkable - UK, 2012
It Felt Like A Kiss - 2013
 Diary of a Grace - 2014
 The Worst Girlfriend In The World - UK, 2014
 It felt like a Kiss - 2014
 After The Last Dance - UK, 2016
 London Belongs to Us - UK, 2016
 The House of Secrets - UK, 2017
The Rise and Fall of Becky Sharp- UK, 2018

References

External links 
Official author's blog
Author's MySpace page
Author details 
Sarra Manning, Penguin Group (USA)
"Spotlight on Sarra Manning", BBC Blast Writing

Living people
British journalists
British women journalists
Year of birth missing (living people)
Alumni of the University of Sussex
Melody Maker writers
British women editors
English women novelists